The Brittain River is a river of the Sunshine Coast of the Canadian province of British Columbia.

The Brittain River is part of the traditional territory of the Shishalh (or Sechelt) people.

The river is named for Rowland Brittain, British Columbia's first patent attorney and owned land at the river's mouth in 1901–1902. Its Shishalh name is slhílhem. The Shishalh consider the entire Brittain River watershed of extremely high cultural and spiritual value and home to numerous cultural resources and ceremonial, spiritual, legendary, and oral history sites. In addition the river valley was a traditional travel route to Powell River.

Course
The Brittain River originates at Arctic Lake in the Pacific Ranges. It flows east through Doris Lake then turns south. It flows through a forested, mountainous, glaciated U-shaped valley to Jervis Inlet.

Natural history
Historically the Brittain River supported anadromous salmon and trout in its lower , and non-anadromous trout and char in its upper reaches. Anadromous fish populations include coho, Chinook, chum, and pink salmon, as well as steelhead and cutthroat trout. Non-anadromous fish include cutthroat and Dolly Varden. The river's watershed has a long history of heavy logging with associated wildfires, along with mineral exploration. This has significantly altered the aquatic habitats of the lower Brittain River.

The Shishalh consider the river a good candidate for fishery and wildlife rehabilitation.

See also
 List of British Columbia rivers

References

Rivers of British Columbia
Rivers of the Pacific Ranges
New Westminster Land District